The 2003 Black Reel Awards, which annually recognize and celebrate the achievements of black people in feature, independent and television films, took place in Washington, D.C. on March 2, 2003. Antwone Fisher took home five awards during the ceremony, with The Rosa Parks Story receiving four awards.

Winners and nominees
Winners are listed first and highlighted in bold.

References

2003 in American cinema
2003 awards in the United States
Black Reel Awards
2002 film awards